This list of tallest structures in Africa ranks man-made structures in Africa that stand at least  tall, based on standard height measurement. List is containing only completed structures, including demolished or destroyed structures.

References 

Africa
Tall